A reach is a segment of a stream, river, or arm of the sea, usually suggesting a straight, level, uninterrupted stretch.

They are traditionally defined by the capabilities of sailing boats, as a stretch of a watercourse which, because it is straightish, can be sailed in one reach (that is, without tacking).

Reaches are often named by those using the river, and a reach may be named for landmarks, natural features, and historical reasons (see, for instance, Gallions' Reach, named after the family that once owned its banks).

A reach may be an expanse, or widening, of a stream or river channel. This commonly occurs after the river or stream is dammed. A reach is similar to an arm, though an arm may bend and thus have multiple reaches. The term "reach" can also refer to a level stretch, as between river rapids or locks in a canal. The word may also be used more generally to refer to any extended portion or stretch of land or water, or even metaphorically.

In fluvial hydrology, a reach is a convenient subdivision of study; it may be any length of river of fairly uniform characteristics, or the length between gauging stations, or simply the length of a watercourse between any two defined points. These may be measured in terms of river miles.

As of 2015, the US Board on Geographic Names records 334 place names in the US with the characterization of a named "reach".

Gallery

See also

Meander
Rapid
Stream pool

References

Physical geography
Fluvial landforms
Rivers
Water streams
Hydrology